The fifth edition of the Pan Pacific Swimming Championships, a long course (50 m) event involving countries in the Pacific region, was held on August 12–15, 1993 in Kobe, Japan.

Competing nations

Results

Men's events

Legend: WR: World record, CR: Championship record

Women's events

Legend: WR: World record, CR: Championship record

See also
List of Pan Pacific Championships records in swimming

References
For the Record, Swimming World Magazine, October 1993.

 
Pan Pacific Swimming Championships
Pan Pacific
Pan Pacific Swimming Championships
International aquatics competitions hosted by Japan
Swimming competitions in Japan